Cerekvička-Rosice is a municipality in Jihlava District in the Vysočina Region of the Czech Republic. It has about 200 inhabitants.

Administrative parts
The municipality is made up of villages of Cerekvička and Rosice.

References

Villages in Jihlava District